Scopula incanata is a moth of the family Geometridae. It is found from north-eastern Europe and the Caucasus to southern Siberia and northern Mongolia.

The wingspan is 25–28 mm. Adults are on wing from late July to August in one generation per year.

The larvae feed on Thymus and Polygonum species. Larvae can be found from August to May. It overwinters in the larval stage.

Subspecies
Scopula incanata incanata
Scopula incanata ibericata Reisser 1935
Scopula incanata rubeni Viidalepp, 1979

References

External links
Fauna Europaea
Lepiforum.de

Moths described in 1758
incanata
Moths of Europe
Moths of Asia
Taxa named by Carl Linnaeus